Live in Munich is an album by The Thad Jones/Mel Lewis Orchestra that won the Grammy Award for Best Jazz Instrumental Performance, Big Band in 1979.

Track listing

Personnel
 Thad Jones – flugelhorn
 Mel Lewis – drums
 Earl Gardner – trumpet
 Frank Gordon – trumpet
 Lynn Nicholson – trumpet
 Al Porcino – trumpet
 Clifford Adams – trombone
 Billy Campbell – trombone
 Earl McIntyre – trombone
 John Mosca – trombone
 Pepper Adams – saxophone
 Jerry Dodgion – saxophone, flute
 Greg Herbert – saxophone, flute, clarinet
 Larry Schneider – saxophone, flute, clarinet
 Ed Xiques – saxophone, flute
 Harold Danko – piano
 Bob Bowman – double bass

References

External links
 [ Allmusic]

1976 live albums
The Thad Jones/Mel Lewis Orchestra live albums
Horizon Records albums
Grammy Award for Best Large Jazz Ensemble Album